USA-178, also known as GPS IIR-12 and GPS SVN-60, is an American navigation satellite which forms part of the Global Positioning System. It was the twelfth Block IIR GPS satellite to be launched, out of thirteen in the original configuration, and twenty one overall. It was built by Lockheed Martin, using the AS-4000 satellite bus.

USA-178 was launched at 22:54:00 UTC on 23 June 2004, atop a Delta II carrier rocket, flight number D305, flying in the 7925-9.5 configuration. The launch took place from Space Launch Complex 17B at the Cape Canaveral Air Force Station, and placed USA-178 into a transfer orbit. The satellite raised itself into medium Earth orbit using a Star-37FM apogee motor.

It is used to broadcast the PRN 23 signal, and operates in slot 4 of plane F of the GPS constellation. As of March 2020 it is no longer in service.

References

Spacecraft launched in 2004
GPS satellites
USA satellites